Pabellón criollo is a traditional Venezuelan dish, the local version of the rice and beans combination found throughout the Caribbean. It is a plate of rice, shredded beef in stew and stewed black beans.

Variants
Common additions include tajadas (fried plantain slices) or a fried egg, and both of these variants have acquired slang names. A pabellón con barandas (baranda is Spanish for guard rail) is served with tajadas because the long plantain slices placed on the sides are humorously considered to be keeping the food from falling off from the plate. A pabellón a caballo (a caballo is Spanish for horseback riding) means with a fried egg on top, as though the egg were "riding" the dish. Besides these two main variants, people also add other things to the dish such as granulated sugar on the beans, Queso Palmita over the beans or hot sauce over the meat.

The shredded beef can be replaced by chigüire, shredded caiman meat or even freshwater fish depending on the region, time of the year (beef consumption is prohibited by the Roman Catholic Church during Lent; however, capybara and fish are approved) or personal taste.

See also

Arroz con gandules - similar dish in Puerto Rico
Platillo Moros y Cristianos - similar dish in Cuba
Ropa Vieja - Beef component of the dish is also popular in Cuba
Gallo Pinto - similar dish in Nicaragua and Costa Rica
Hoppin' John - similar dish in the Southern United States
Rice and peas - similar dish in Jamaica
List of rice dishes

References

Venezuelan cuisine
Latin American rice dishes
Legume dishes
National dishes